Bommireddy Narasimha Reddy (16 November 1908 – 8 November 1977), professionally known as B. N. Reddy, was an Indian film director, producer, and screenwriter. He was an early figure in the Telugu cinema. Many of his earlier films like Vande Mataram (1939), Devatha (1941) had V. Nagayya as the lead. His Malliswari (1951) starring N. T. Rama Rao and Bhanumathi is considered a timeless Indian film classic. He was the first person to receive the Dadasaheb Phalke Award from South India. He was the first Indian film personality to receive the Doctor of Letters honor.

Early life
Bommireddy Narasimha Reddy was born on 16 November 1908 in a farmer family at Kothapalli village in the present-day Kadapa district. His father Narasimha Reddy  used to export onions from Chennai to Rangoon (Yangoon) for a living. He was eldest of four brothers; others are B. Nagi Reddy, B. N. Konda Reddy and B. Ramalinga Reddy.

He was schooled in Proddatur and later continued the schooling in Madras. He enrolled in Pachaiyappa's College, but left without graduating. He later studies auditing and accounting and worked as an apprentice in an auditing firm.

Career 
When H. M. Reddy decided to turn a producer, B.N. Reddy and B. Nagi Reddi joined hands with him to form Rohini Pictures.

Awards
National Film Awards
1955 – President's Silver Medal for Best Feature Film in Telugu – Bangaru Papa
1957 – Certificate of Merit for Best Feature Film in Telugu – Bhagya Rekha
1966 – National Film Award for Best Feature Film in Telugu – Rangula Ratnam
1974 – Dadasaheb Phalke Award at the 22nd National Film Awards

Filmfare Awards
Filmfare Best Film Award (Telugu) – Bangaru Panjaram (1969)

Nandi Awards
Best Feature Film - Gold - Rangula Ratnam (1966)
Third Best Feature Film - Bronze - Bangaru Panjaram (1969)
Best Story Writer - Pelli Kani Pelli (1976)

Civilian honours
Padmabhushan

Other honours
Doctor of letters

Filmography
B. N. Reddy directed 11 feature films.

Producer
Bhakta Pothana (1942) - Production supervision

References

External links
 

1977 deaths
Dadasaheb Phalke Award recipients
1908 births
Recipients of the Padma Bhushan in arts
People from Rayalaseema
People from Kadapa district